Zhalanash is a salt lake in the Moiynkum District, Jambyl Region, Kazakhstan.

The lake basin is used as a seasonal grazing ground for local cattle.

Geography
Zhalanash lies at the northern edge of the Moiynkum Desert, in the lower Chu river basin. The shores of the lake are low and flat.

Zhalanash is known as a "dead lake" in Kazakh. Its waters freeze at the end of December and thaw at the end of March. On average the  water level rises right after the melting of the snows in the spring and decreases in the summer.

See also
List of lakes of Kazakhstan

References

External links

Chu-Talas, Kazakhstan
Special feature of the Journal Sandgrouse: Proceedings of the International Conference ‘Advancing the Conservation of the Great Bustard in Asia’.

Lakes of Kazakhstan
Jambyl Region
Chu (river)